"Chinese Eyes" is a song by German singer Fancy from his debut studio album, Get Your Kicks (1985). It was written by Anthony Monn and Todd Canedy.

Track listing and formats 
 German 7-inch single

A. "Chinese Eyes" – 4:24
B. "Burn with Impatience" – 4:27

 German 12-inch maxi-single

A. "Chinese Eyes" – 5:48
B. "Burn with Impatience" – 4:58

Charts

References

External links 
 

1984 songs
1984 singles
Fancy (singer) songs
Metronome Records singles
Song recordings produced by Fancy (singer)
Songs written by Anthony Monn